Phora was a town of ancient Greece on Patmos. 

Its site is located on Patmos.

References

Populated places in the ancient Aegean islands
Former populated places in Greece
Patmos